The song Egidius waer bestu bleven is an early rondo in Middle Dutch.

History
The song is preserved with musical notation in the Gruuthuse manuscript, which dates from around 1400. It was first published in 1849 by Charles Carton. In 1966 Liederen en gedichten uit het Gruuthuse-handschrift was published by K. Heeroma, which made the lyrics available to a wider audience. In 2007 the previously privately owned manuscript was bought by the Royal Library of the Netherlands in The Hague.

The song was written in the late 14th century by an unknown author (possibly Jan Moritoen). In 2007, Egidius was identified as Gillis Honin, who died suddenly on 8 October 1385. According to Professor Frits van Oostrom this is the most anthologised poem in Dutch.

Content
Egidius waer bestu bleven is an elegy or a lament about the death of a friend named Egidius. The poet envies Egidius because he has been taken up to heaven, while the poet on earth is unhappy and suffering. He or she asks Egidius to keep a place next to him in heaven. One of the trumps of this poem is that it is not only about Egidius, but is also aimed at him; which only increases the involvement and the emotion. There is also a striking contrast between the first verse (v 4–8) and the second (v 12–16). In the first verse the writer uses positive words: good, nice, happiness; in the second mostly negative: sneven, suffering, pain. The first verse is mainly about Egidius, the second also mentions 'ic' (first person). There is also a contrast between heaven ('troon', verse 1) and earth ('weerelt', verse 2).

The words "Du coors die doot" (you chose death) probably does not refer to suicide, because from the Egidiuslied it seems that Egidius is in heaven and in medieval times they believed that those who committed suicide did not go to heaven. Perhaps 'to choose' should not be taken too literally here and the verb has been used in a reduced sense. A more neutral phrasing 'You have passed on' is closer to the actual meaning.

Egidius also gets another song in Gruuthusehandschrift and this mentions that the man had a beautiful tenor voice. Music was an inherent part of the friendship between Egidius and the poet. But now that Egidius is no longer there, nothing sounds like before. Even singing has become a task: “ic moet noch singhen een liedekijn”. A ditty, like it doesn't matter. This is a poem about loss, rather than dying. The loss has clearly not been processed yet; witness the pointless question: “Egidius, where have you gone?” and also in the form of the song, a roundel that starts and ends with the same verses, suggests the rawness of the loss. The poet reasons in circles as it were, he longs for a dead person – another raw absurdity. But there is comfort; one day they will see each other again. It could take long but still, “verware mijn stede di beneven”, keep my seat, next to you. According to Frits Van Oostrom “de meest ontroerende regel van het hele lied” [the most moving line of the whole song].

Form
The lyrics of the song may be two verses shorter than shown below. After all, the manuscript does not contain them, see the site of the Koninklijke Bibliotheek. In that case, the rhyme scheme is perfectly symmetrical: ABA bbaba ABA ababb ABA. That could indicate that the most important verse of the song is the B verse: “mi lanct na di, gheselle mijn”. The rhyme scheme therefore only has two rhyme sounds (which is normal for a rondelle), namely '-even' and '-ijn' (which is pronounced 'ien' in Middle Dutch). These sharp sounds do not only occur in rhyme position, they are also hidden in the name Egidius and are also quite common elsewhere in the song, for example in the B-verse. In a song about death one would expect mostly dull sounds: oo, oe and aa, but not here; only “du coors die dead” sounds heavy. The light, happy, sharp sounds seem at first glance to be a contrast to the heaviness of the subject, but they also suggest the sharpness of the pain of being cut off. Gerrit Komrij: "The pain of death has opened his eyes to the pain of life." The choice for the sharp sounds (especially ie) may be prompted by the name of the regretted, but there is also a simpler explanation; in Latin literature, the ie was a sound associated with sadness.

Music
The last word has not yet been said about the music of this song. Not only do we not know which words belong to which notes, musicologists are also not quite sure how those notes should be interpreted (= sung). Yet there are various interpretations to be found on the net.

Text of the song

Editions
 C. Carton (ed.), Oud-Vlaemsche liederen en andere gedichten der XIVe en XVe eeuwen, Gent, C. Annoot-Braeckman, 1849.
 K. Heeroma, with C.W.H. Lindenburg, Liederen en gedichten uit het Gruuthusehandschrift, Leiden, 1966.

Studies
 Noël Geirnaert, "Op zoek naar Egidius. Het laatmiddeleeuwse Brugge in het Gruuthusehandschrift", in Het Gruuthusehandschrift in woord en klank. Nieuwe inzichten, nieuwe vragen, edited by Frank Willaert, Leuven, 2010.
 Paul Claes, De sleutel, Nijmegen: Vantilt 2014, 16–20 (new reading).

References

External links 
 Pagina over het Egidiuslied op literatuurgeschiedenis.nl
 Koninklijke Bibliotheek: het Gruuthuse-handschrift
 Tekst 'Egidius' met bladmuziek en muziek (mp3)

Middle Dutch literature
Dutch poems
14th-century poems